Stephen McKenna is an ex professional Scottish association football defensive midfielder. He won the Scottish Challenge Cup in 2008 with Airdrie United and in 2013 with Queen of the South also winning a divisional title with the Queen's that season. McKenna retired from senior football aged 29 to focus on a career outside the game.

Playing career

Airdrie

McKenna joined Airdrie United from Rangers in 2003 and made over 150 first team appearances for the Diamonds. A high point was when he scored in the 2008 Scottish Challenge Cup Final. McKenna's team won on penalties against Ross County.

Queen of the South

On 6 August 2009, McKenna was announced as a new signing on the website of Dumfries club Queen of the South. He played 28 first team league games that season scoring on 16 February 2010 in the 3–0 home win against Ayr United at Palmerston Park. He also played in three cup games including the 2–1 defeat at home against Rangers in the Scottish League Cup. The season after McKenna played in the postponed 2010 Scottish Challenge Cup Final defeat to Ross County.

McKenna scored a goal from 30 yards on 26 November 2011 in the 2–2 draw away to Morton. He scored a goal from a similar distance the following week in the 4–1 home win over Ayr United.

McKenna was an integral part of the Queen's side to win a league and cup double in 2012/13. McKenna and his teammates romped away to win the Scottish Second Division title building an unassailable lead before the end of March. Less than two weeks later McKenna and co won the Scottish League Challenge Cup Final beating Partick Thistle on penalties.

McKenna left senior football at the end of season 2014/15 to work on a professional career outside football. He was 29 at the time.

Cumnock Juniors
McKenna come out of retired at join junior club Cumnock Juniors.

Honours

Airdrie United
 2008-09 Scottish Challenge Cup Winner

Queen of the South
 2012–13 Scottish Division Two Champions
 2012-13 Scottish Challenge Cup Winner

References

External links

Airdrieonians F.C. players
Queen of the South F.C. players
Rangers F.C. players
1985 births
Living people
Scottish footballers
Association football midfielders
Footballers from Glasgow
Scottish Football League players
Scottish Professional Football League players